The Saddle Peak Hills are a mountain range in the Mojave Desert, in northern San Bernardino County, southern California.

They are located within the southeastern corner of Death Valley National Park, northeast of the Avawatz Mountains.

See also
Other ranges in the local area include the:
 Avawatz Mountains
 Dumont Hills
 Salt Spring Hills
 Silurian Hills
 Sperry Hills
 Valjean Hills

References 

Mountain ranges of the Mojave Desert
Mountain ranges of San Bernardino County, California
Death Valley National Park
Hills of California